Istanbul Okan University is a private university in Istanbul, Turkey.

History
The university was founded by Okan Culture, Education, and Sports Foundation in 1999 and began its academic life in 2003–2004.
Since the 2006–2007 academic year, it has been located in its new and modern Akfırat campus.
Now, it reached 63 undergraduate, 41 master and 13 Ph. D. programs under eight faculties, two vocational schools, and three graduate schools

See also
 List of universities in Turkey

References

External links 
  

Istanbul Okan University
Educational institutions established in 1999
Private universities and colleges in Turkey
Kadıköy
1999 establishments in Turkey
Sultanbeyli
Tuzla, Istanbul